Gerlinde Schönbauer (born 7 March 1948) is an Austrian pair skater. With partner Wilhelm Bietak, she represented Austria at the 1964 Winter Olympics, where they placed 12th. Their partnership ended in 1966.

Competitive highlights

References

Navigation

Austrian female pair skaters
Olympic figure skaters of Austria
Figure skaters at the 1964 Winter Olympics
1948 births
Living people